Taman Impian Jaya Ancol also known as Ancol Dreamland is an integral part of Ancol Bay City, a resort destination located along Jakarta's waterfront, in Ancol (Kelurahan), Pademangan, North Jakarta, Indonesia.
It is owned by PT. Pembangunan Jaya Ancol Tbk, a subsidiary of Pembangunan Jaya Group. Ancol Dreamland opened in 1966 and is currently the largest integrated tourism area in South East Asia, boasting an international championship golf course, a theme park, hotels and other recreational facilities.

History
Before Ancol Dreamland, Ancol was a mosquito-infested swamps and fish ponds, and the source of century-old malaria outbreak in Batavia. The idea to convert the marshy area of Ancol into Jakarta's largest entertainment center, with housing and industrial estates adjoining it, was proposed by President Sukarno in the early 1960s. The idea opposed the initial idea to convert the area of Ancol into a purely industrial area.

Development of Ancol was started during the tenure of Ali Sadikin, the governor of Jakarta in 1966. The entertainment complex was named Taman Impian Jaya Ancol or Ancol Dreamland. The first facility was the Bina Ria Ancol beach, best known for its drive-in theater especially during the 1970s, then followed with a golf course, swimming pool, oceanarium, Putri Duyung cottage, Hotel Horison and its casino.  The Dunia Fantasi (Fantasy World) theme park was built in 1984.

Entertainment and amusement parks
Today, the 552 hectare recreation area is known as the Ancol Jakarta Bay City, contains hotels, cottages, beaches, a theme park, traditional market places, an oceanarium, a golf field and marina.

Dunia Fantasi (Fantasy World)

Dunia Fantasi (often shortened to "Dufan") is Jakarta's own theme park complete with over 40 rides and attractions. It is located in North Jakarta, facing the Java Sea. The theme park is divided into eight regions which are Jakarta, Indonesia, Asia, Africa, America, Europe, and Fantasi Hikayat (Legendary Fantasy) region featuring Ancient Greece and Ancient Egypt architecture. The theme park complies with international standards through ISO 9001:2000 certification. Admission to Dunia Fantasi is chargeable at around Rp 295.000 from Mondays to Fridays, and Rp 325.000 on Saturday, Sundays and public holidays. It is considered as Jakarta's largest and most interesting recreation park, and located on reclaimed land at the Bay of Jakarta. According to the Jakarta Tourism & Culture Office website, other attractions within include the Art Market, an Eco-Park and an Ocean Park. In the district of Ancol where Dunia Fantasi is located, it is a common getaway for tourists and locals alike, away from the hustle and bustle of the city.

Among its most popular attractions are Halilintar (a roller coaster manufactured by Arrow Dynamics), Niagara-gara (a log flume), Istana Boneka (a local version of Disney's It's a Small World) and Balada Kera (Monkey Parody – animatronics show) Theater show. Other attractions include Bianglala (ferris wheel), Kora-Kora (swinging ship), Poci-Poci (spinning cups ride), Kereta Misteri, (an indoor roller coaster manufactured by Intamin), and the Hysteria (drop tower).

Several of the latest and newest rides are Kicir-Kicir (Power Surge) (2004), Perang Bintang (Star Wars) (changed to Galactica a Battle for Mars since 2017) (2005) - an interactive dark ride, Meteor Attack (2006) and Tornado (Windshear by Zamperla) (2007). Some seasonal attractions include Le Belles cabaret show, Russian Circus and Euro Kids Circus.

A former Show Building that used to house the Ramashinta: Legend of The Future ride was burned in 2004 and then converted into a large indoor exhibition hall, occasionally hosting special shows. Then in 2014 is reimagined into Indoor Dufan Section that contain Ice Age: Sid's Tour, Kontiki, Hello Kitty Adventure (Rumored will be replaced).

Since June 21, 2011 Dunia Fantasi (Dufan) will open Kalila Adventure Animatronic Theater which is the most complete in the world. The theme stories are about Beautiful Indonesia. Then in 2018 Kalila Section is closed to make way the expansion of America Section in the park that contain the biggest indoor coaster in Indonesia themed to America on the 19th Century that will tell the story of the Werewolf that lived in the house.

In March 2019 the park has announced a new area set to open mid to late 2019 with 9 new attractions: Baling Baling (a Zierer Star Shape, also the first in Asia), Paralayang (an SBF Visa Group Airborne Shot), Turbo Drop (an SBF Visa Group Drop'n Twist), Fantastique 2.0 (Delay until further notice), Kereta Misteri (a werewolf themed indoor tracked ride from an Intamin Manufacter), Karavel, Kolibri, Zig Zag and Ontang Anting.

Atlantis Water Adventure
Atlantis Water Adventure was built on the former site of Gelanggang Renang (Swimming Courtyard). Occupying over five hectares of land, this water park is themed on the mythological underwater world of Atlantis. Its facilities include a wave pool, continuous flowing river pool, rainbow ball pool, waterfall pool, several slides, two children's pools, five restaurants, and a food court that was imported from India, Brazil, Spain, Bangladesh. A volleyball court and event center are also available to accommodate the needs of visitors.

Ocean Dream Samudra

Ocean Dream Samudra features several animal shows, a small aquarium, and a 4D theater. The trained animal shows include a dolphin show and sea lion show. The 4D theater projects 3D image movies with sensations such as cool breezes and water sprays located inside a large building with Mesoamerican pyramid theme. In 2011 Ocean Dream Samudra will be revitalized with a budget of Rp.27 billion ($3.1 million). Ocean Dream Samudra now holds the "Under the Sea Musical Dance" attraction at Underwater Theater.

Sea World Ancol
 
SeaWorld Ancol was the largest oceanarium in South East Asia at the time it was opened, in 1996, as SeaWorld Jakarta. It was owned by Lippo Group until 2014, when contract problems caused it to be owned by Jaya Ancol now. It features the acclaimed Antasena tunnel as well as the touch pool and shark aquarium. Despite its name, it is completely unaffiliated with the US-based SeaWorld Parks & Entertainment and their parks in Orlando, San Antonio, and San Diego.

Beaches

There are two main beaches within the resort, the Carnival and Festival beach.  British band Iron Maiden has played for the first time in Indonesia on 17 February 2011 at the Carnival Beach site, to over 25,000 strong crowd.

Pasar Seni
Pasar Seni is an Art Market that started over 25 years ago. .  It has become a center for handicrafts and art products. This art market has an open state, plaza, and souvenir shops. Pasar Seni has also become a center where artists would create and sell their products. Every Friday night at 8:30 pm, Pasar Seni Ancol organized the event named "New Friday Jazz Nite".

Executive Golf Fun

Ancol's Golf Course has recently relaunched as Executive Golf Fun. This is Indonesia's first international beach golf course with 18 holes spread over an area of 33 hectares. The golf course has a pro-shop, an executive room, a meeting hall and restaurants.

Jaya Bowling
Ancol Dreamland has several facilities for games and entertainment. One of these facilities is Jaya Bowling. This bowling center is the first and largest bowling center in Indonesia. Indonesia's National Bowling Training Center is in Jaya Bowling.

Allianz Eco Park
It was built in 2011 by PT Global Land Development Tbk with a budget of Rp.15 billion ($1.7 million). This area  consists of 4 themes, Eco Energy, Eco Care, Eco Nature and Eco Art. It once hosted the 2013 World Robot Olympiad and the finale and result and reunion show of Indonesian Idol 2012.

Faunaland
Faunaland is an mini zoo located inside Allianz Ecopark and stands on an area of approximately 5 hectares consisting of land and water. Faunaland carries the concept of New Guinea.

Ancol Beach City

Ancol Beach City is a new Lifestyle & Entertainment Center in Ancol, Jakarta. It was built by PT Wahana Agung Indonesia, a subsidiary of PT Global Land Development Tbk (now MNC Land). There'll be a Madame Tussauds wax Museum, Mata Elang International Stadium Concert Hall with a maximum capacity of 22.000, 77 culinary centre, 42 shops, etc.

Transportation
Ancol Dreamland can easily be reached by car, motorcycle, KRL Commuterline, or the TransJakarta Busway. Passengers who wants to go to Ancol Dreamland by train can arrive on Ancol Station. Because Ancol Dreamland is so large, effective transportation has been a concern. Some transportation methods around Ancol Dreamland include becak (rickshaw) and other vehicles such as train ride from the east entrance to Carnaval beach, and gondola to help tourists navigate around the area to their next destination. Passengers from Kampung Melayu, Harmoni, and Pusat Grosir Cililitan can use Transjakarta Busway to go to Ancol Dreamland.

Gondola

This is the latest transportation alternative in the area. The Gondola is a skylift cable car system with thirty-seven cars built along the shore of Jakarta's bay. It offers a view of the resort and the sea as well as the city.

Hotels
 Putri Duyung Cottage is the home of beach cottages with over 137 waterfront rooms. Putri Duyung Cottage is also one of building projects of PT Global Land Development Tbk. 
 Mercure Convention Centre, formerly the Hotel Horison, is a four-star hotel that consists of a hotel tower and large mice facility. The hotel was built in the 1970s as the largest hotel at Ancol. In the 1970s, there was the Copacabana Casino, one of the three legal casinos in Jakarta that were licensed in 1967 by Governor Ali Sadikin (the others being casinos on Jalan Thamrin and Jalan Hayam Wuruk) in order to raise venture to help fund development of the city's infrastructure. Pressure from religious leaders eventually forced the government to ban all gambling in 1981.
 Hotel Raddin Ancol is an Accor's Mercure managed hotel located by the side of Dunia Fantasi.

Residential
Ancol project also included a residential development to the east of Putri Duyung Cottage developed back in the 1970s. Some of the residential projects were the Ancol Mansion apartment complex.

Future developments
Ancol Taman Impian is planned to be expanded mainly through land reclamation along Jakarta's bay with a land reserve of over eighty hectares. A long-term goal includes a major project named Ocean Fantasy (Theme Park names not yet final and may be changed in the future as Ancol does not yet speak further of this project) as well as the construction of the Marina Sports Centre and Carnival Beach Club. And this year Ancol is going to Build the Bird Park right next to Ocean Dream Samudra.

Accidents
A cement-based decorative wall of a water slide of the Atlantis Water Adventure Park collapsed due to corrosion and made a part of the wall of water slide also collapse on September 25, 2011 injuring four visitors, including a child. The Jakarta Construction Supervision and Regulation Agency said, "There will be an audit by a consultant before the management is allowed to rebuild the collapsed structure." Less than 3 months previously, there was another cement structure that collapsed and in July 2011, fifteen passengers panicked when they were stuck on their seats when the Tornado thrill ride stalled.

See also

Ancol
Jakarta
Vihara Bahtera Bhakti

References

Cited works

External links

Official site

Amusement parks in Indonesia
Parks and lakes in Jakarta
Buildings and structures in Jakarta
Animatronic attractions
Tourist attractions in Jakarta
Amusement parks opened in 1966
Venues of the 2018 Asian Games
Regionally-owned companies of Indonesia